Md Afaque Alam is an Indian politician belonging to Indian National Congress. He is a member of the Bihar Legislative Assembly. He won from Kasba, Purnia in the Feb 2005, 2010, 2015 and  2020 Bihar Legislative Assembly election. He is the current deputy leader of Indian National Congress in Bihar Legislative Assembly and also the general secretary of Mahagathbandhan (Bihar). Also, currently, he is serving as the Minister of Animal Husbandry Dairying and Fisheries, Bihar.

References 

Living people
Year of birth missing (living people)
People from Purnia district
Indian National Congress politicians from Bihar
Bihar MLAs 2005–2010
Bihar MLAs 2010–2015
Bihar MLAs 2015–2020
Bihar MLAs 2020–2025